Bremner is a surname of Scottish origin, and may refer to:
Alison Bremner, American and Tlingit contemporary artist
Anne Bremner (born 1958), American attorney and television personality
Bill Bremner (1879–1961), New Zealand lawn bowler
Billy Bremner (1942–1997), Scottish footballer (Leeds United, Scotland national team)
Billy Bremner (Australian footballer), (1872–1957), Australian rules footballer
Billy Bremner (musician), (born 1946), Scottish musician
Chelsea Bremner (born 1995), New Zealand rugby union player
Des Bremner (born 1952), Scottish footballer (Hibernian, Aston Villa, Scotland national team)
Ewen Bremner (born 1972), Scottish film actor
Gordon Bremner (born 1917), Scottish footballer (Arsenal FC, Motherwell FC)
Hutton Bremner (1912–1969), Scottish footballer
Ian Bremner (born 1947), Australian rules footballer
James Bremner (1784–1856), Scottish naval architect
Janice Bremner (born 1974), Canadian synchronized swimmer
Kyla Bremner (born 1977), Canadian-born Australian freestyle wrestler
Marie Bremner (1904–1980), Australian soprano
Raymond Bremner, Toronto Commissioner of Public Works 1963–1990; Bremner Boulevard named for him
Robert Bremner or Brymer (c. 1713–1789), Scottish music publisher
Robert G. Bremner (1874–1914), American newspaper publisher and Democrat politician
Robert H. Bremner (1917-2002), professor of history at Ohio State University
Rory Bremner (born 1961), Scottish comedian

See also
Bremner Point, Queensland, Australia

Surnames of Scottish origin